Mulhern is an Irish (midland and Ulster) Catholic family name. It is anglicized form of Gaelic Ó Maoilchiaráin, ‘descendant of Maoilchiaráin’ , a personal name meaning ‘devotee of (Saint) Ciarán’ (a personal name from a diminutive of ciar ‘black’). The Mulhern family is largely based in Gaeltacht communities across County Donegal, Ireland (1500–present) with also distant relatives scattered around the United Kingdom and North America.

History: The Irish surname Mulhern is an Anglicised form of the Gaelic Ó Maoilchiaráin, which literally signifies “(the descendant of) the devotee of St. Kieran”, the latter being an Irish bishop said to predate St. Patrick and to have been a hermit at Saighar and founder of the famous abbey of Clonmacnois. The personal name itself means “my little dark one”. The Ó Maoilchiaráin were a Roscommon family who served as erenaghs of Ardcane in that county and produced many notable ecclesiastics - erenaghs were hereditary lay lords who held church lands in trust from generation to generation. Records of the name in Roscommon date as far back as 1012, when the Annals of the four Masters refer to the slaying of an Ó Maoilchiaráin who was erenagh of Eaglis Beg (Clonmacnois). Other ecclesiastics of note from the Medieval period were Denis O’Mulkerrin (died 1224), Bishop of Elphin, and Maelisa O’Mulkerrin (died 1197), Bishop of Clogher. At a slightly later period, Father John Mulcheran, hanged in December, 1589, was one of many Ulster martyrs. In Roscommon itself, the name has generally Anglicised as Mulkerrill, while amongst those branches which became established elsewhere it has become Mulkerrin in Galway, with the Mulhern/Mulhearne variant being particularly associated with the northern province of Ulster, where it was first recorded in the Hearth Money Rolls of Armagh and Donegal in the sixteenth and seventeenth centuries as Mulkieran. By 1890, however, of the 21 Mulhern births registered throughout Ireland, two-thirds took place in Ulster, with nine out of ten Mulkerrin births occurring in Galway *** 
Beazon of Arms: Per fesse argent and azure, three chaplets counterchanged. 
Translation: Argent (white) is the colour of Peace and Sincerity, whilst azure (Blue) denotes Loyalty and Truth. The chaplet is an emblem of “the crown of joy”.
Crest: On a mount vert, a horse at full speed, saddled and bridled proper.
Origin: Ireland
(Extract taken from The Historical Research Center, Inc.)

People
 John Mulhern (1888–1916), IRA member
 Elliot James Mulhern (born 1989), American drummer
 Michael Mulhern (1889–1921), IRA member (Anti-Treaty)
 Francis Mulhern (born 1952), British critical theorist
 Francis J. Mulhern, associate dean of research at the Medill School of Journalism at Northwestern University
 John Mulhern (1927–2007), American ice hockey player
 Lee Mulhern also known as Lee Matthews and Lee.M (born 1988), Irish singer-songwriter
 Mary Mulhern (born 1959), American councilwoman of the City Council in Tampa, Florida
 Matt Mulhern (born 1960), American actor
 Jon Mulhern (born 1985), American artist, painter and sculptor.
 Quinn Mulhern (born 1984), American mixed martial artist
 Richard Mulhern (born 1955), Canadian ice hockey defenceman
 Ryan Mulhern (born 1973), American ice hockey player
 Stephen Mulhern (born 1977), British broadcaster and entertainer
 Dennis Mulhern (born 1940's), fifth generation Donegal Tweed handweaver and founder of Triona Design in Ardara, Co. Donegal
Louis Mulkern (1920-2012), American banker and international businessman for Bank of America across east asia

Other
 Mulhern Belting, supplier of conveyor belts to the United States and the world.
 Mulhern House, historic home located at Wappingers Falls in Dutchess County, New York.

See also
 Mulhearn

Anglicised Irish-language surnames
Surnames
Surnames of Irish origin